Gonzalo Taborda (born in San Francisco, Argentina) is a former Argentine footballer who played for Clubs of Argentina, Chile and Uruguay.

Teams
  Deportivo Colonia 2002-2003
  El Porvenir 2003-2005
  Central Córdoba 2006
  Unión San Felipe 2006
  Central Córdoba 2007-2008
  Acassuso 2008-2009

External links
 

Living people
Argentine footballers
Argentine expatriate footballers
Unión San Felipe footballers
Primera B de Chile players
Expatriate footballers in Chile
Expatriate footballers in Uruguay
Association football defenders
Association football midfielders
Year of birth missing (living people)
People from San Francisco, Córdoba
Sportspeople from Córdoba Province, Argentina